The 2nd Infantry Division, Philippine Army nicknamed Jungle Fighter, is the Philippine Army's primary infantry unit specializing in jungle warfare.

History

2nd Regular Division, Philippine Commonwealth Army during World War II under the Japanese Invasion

The 2nd Regular Division, Philippine Commonwealth Army, was activated 6 January 1942, uniting the 4 existing Philippine Constabulary Regiments under one divisional command.  Part of these troops were at Camp Murphy (now Camp Emilio Aguinaldo) in Quezon City and part at Fort William McKinley (now Fort Andres Bonifacio) in Taguig, Rizal (now part of Metro Manila). The Armed Forces reorganization acts passed in 1936 led to the decision to militarize Constabulary (Police) officers into organized fighting units. The Constabulary reverted to their original semi-military ("gendarme") structure in 1938.  But the need for more armed Filipinos to aid in resisting the rise and possible threat of Japanese military operations in mid-1941 led to the re-establishment of formal military organization of the Constabulary forces.  Therefore, the organization of four regiments finally got underway in the early Fall of 1941, and upon activation, each regiment was inducted into the tables of organization and orders of battle for the United States Army Forces in the Far East (USAFFE).  The 1st Philippine Constabulary Regiment dates from 15 Oct 1941; the 2nd Regiment from 17 Nov 1941; the 3rd Regiment from 12 Dec 1941; and the 4th Regiment from 29 Dec 1941.

Most of the 1st Regiment and all of the 2nd had been guarding public utilities and other targets of potential sabotage in the Manila metro area.  By 31 Dec 1941, the 3rd and newly formed 4th Regiments were on Bataan, or were en route.  But after the withdrawal of American troops from Manila (to avoid a battle in the city) the 1st and 2nd Regiments also moved to Bataan.  Here they were moved under the umbrella of the new 2nd Division (PC) (Philippine Constabulary) after its activation on 6 January 1942. The 2nd Division commander was BGen. (later MGen.) Guillermo B. Francisco.

The 2nd Division was on Bataan from 6 Jan 1942 to the fall of the peninsula on 9 Apr 1942, aiding the Gen. Douglas MacArthur's USAFFE military forces, against the Imperial Japanese troops led by General Masaharu Homma during the Battle of Bataan in 1942.

Throughout the main battle for the Bataan peninsula, from February to April 1942, Constabulary troops and officers fought side by side with other Philippine Commonwealth and American forces of the USAFFE, attacking and defending against Japanese troops.  These battles include the Layac Line, Porac-Guagua Line, Abucay-Mauban Line, Battle of Trail 2, the Battle of the Pockets and the Battle of the Points, before the invasion at Mount Samat on 3 Apr 1942.  On that date—Good Friday—Mount Samat fell.  On 9 April 1942, the starving defending Fil-American forces, including the 2nd Division, surrendered to the Imperial Japanese Army on Bataan.  After the enemy forces organized the surrendered troops into one large group, all Filipinos and Americans began the long walk from Mariveles, Bataan to Camp O'Donnell in Capas, Tarlac. This was the start of the Bataan Death March.

2nd Infantry Division, Philippine Army during the Post-War Era

On 1 February 1970, the 2nd Infantry Brigade (Separate) was activated.  Its first headquarters was in Camp Vicente Lim in Canlubang, Calamba City and later, was moved to Barangay Sampaloc, Tanay, Rizal.  Camp Capinpin, the present camp, was named after Brigadier General Mateo M. Capinpin, the intrepid commander of the 21st Division, Philippine Army, USAFFE, who rose from the ranks during World War I.  It is strategically situated 70 kilometers east of Manila at the foothills of the scenic Sierra Madre Mountains, at an elevation of 1,400 feet above sea level.

On 19 March 1976, the 2nd Infantry Brigade was upgraded and reorganized as the 2nd Infantry Division, Philippine Army, at Camp Mateo Capinpin.  Since the reorganization, twenty-five successive Commanders have already led the 2nd Infantry Division.

This expansion from a brigade to a full division became necessary as brigade troops were assigned to combat the Communist rebels and local criminal element operations in Southern Luzon and beyond.  These combat engagements were carried out over multiple regions and provinces, including the two regions of Calabarzon and Mimaropa, and the nine major provinces of Rizal, Cavite, Laguna, Batangas, Quezon, Occidental Mindoro, Oriental Mindoro, Marinduque and Palawan.  The ongoing Communist insurgencies in the Philippines began in 1969 with the Communist rebel fighters of the New People's Army (NPA), and worsened to include the Communist Party of the Philippines (CPP), the National Democratic Front of the Philippines (NDF-P), and other local criminal elements.  Battling these destructive elements, with both military and criminal aspects, hearkens back to the Constabulary roots of the 2nd Division.

In August 2016, President Rodrigo Duterte pulled out the 68th and 74th Infantry Battalion from Southern Luzon and reassigned them to Basilan in order to aid against the Abu Sayyaf Group. The pullout of the 74th Infantry Battalion left the province of Marinduque without a regular military contingent, leaving only the Citizen Armed Force Geographical Unit of the 59th Infantry Battalion to secure the province.

2ID Seal
The 2nd Infantry Division's emblem inscribes the Command's banner. It symbolizes the aspiration for peace and tranquility of the Filipino people within the Divisions area of jurisdiction.

RED-COLORED BACKGROUND – the red colored background of the diamond signifies courage and bravery.

WHITE-COLORED BAND – the white colored band running at its edge marks the unblemished reputation of the die-hard vanguard of freedom.

THREE YELLOW-COLORED STARS – represents the three major islands of the Philippines (Luzon, Visayas and Mindanao).

DIAMOND SHAPE – the diamond shape connotes the extent of the Division's areas of operation.

KRIS – superimposed over the number "2" is the "Kris", a dominant weapon, which represents the unity of the guardian of freedom and independence of the Filipino people. The silver blade implies the dignity of the people.

NUMERICAL FIGURE 2 – the Arabic numerical "2", located at the center of the diamond, distinguishes itself as the "Second-to-None Hard Hitting Division" of the Army for its combat action against internal or external enemies/threats. The blue-colored number `2` signifies patriotism.

Mission
The current mission of the 2nd Infantry Division is to conduct Focused Military Operations while sustaining support to the Regional Task Force to End Local Communist Armed Conflict (RTF-ELCAC), to decisively defeat the Southern Tagalog Regional Party Committee (STRPC) armed groups and deny their manpower, financial, and logistical resources in order to bring them back to the breaking point of their collapse and eventual end of insurgency in Regions 4A and 4B (except Palawan) that will create a safe and sound environment—both physically and psychologically—conducive for development and commerce.

Lineage of Commanding Officers
 BGen. Domingo R. Tucay, PA – (01 February 1970 – 01 April 1970)
 BGen. Teodorico R. Almuete, PA – (01 April 1970 – 16 January 1970)
 BGen. Juan L. Razo, PA – (16 January 1970 – 18 February 1972)
 BGen. Ramon L. Cannu, PA – (19 February 1972 – 17 September 1979)
 BGen. Zoshimo C. Carlos, PA – (18 September 1979 – 17 January 1982)
 BGen. Ramon L. Cannu, PA – (17 January 1982 – 16 August 1983)
 BGen. Roland I. Pattugalan, PA – (16 August 1983 – 04 March 1986)
 BGen. Restituto C. Padilla, PA – (05 March 1986 – 15 March 1987)
 BGen. Alejandro A. Galido, PA – (16 March 1987 – 18 March 1988)
 BGen. Raul T. Aquino, PA – (26 March 1988 – 16 April 1989)
 BGen. Javier D. Carbonnel, PA – (16 April 1989 – 03 December 1989)
 BGen. Thelmo Y. Cunanan, PA – (03 December 1989 – 24 January 1991)
 BGen. Cesar F. Fortuno, PA – (26 January 1991 – 25 March 1992)
 BGen. Regino J. Lacson, PA – (22 March 1992 – 23 February 1995)
 BGen. Romeo D. Lopez, PA – (23 February 1995 – 16 August 1996)
 BGen. Samuel T. Dungque, PA – (16 August 1996 – 08 October 1997)
 BGen. Rolando C. Bautista, PA – (09 October 1997 – 12 January 1998)
 MGen. Jose S. Lachica, PA – (12 January 1998 – 01 March 2000)
 MGen. Roberto P. Santiago, PA – (06 March 2000 – 08 March 2001)
 MGen. Jacinto C. Ligot, PA – (28 March 2001 – 6 May 2002)
 MGen. Efren L. Abu, PA – (6 May 2002 – 30 July 2003)
 MGen. Gabriel M. Ledesma, PA – (30 July 2003 – 21 January 2004)
 MGen. Pedro R. Cabuay Jr., PA – ( 21 January 2004 – 21 November 2004)
 MGen. Alexander B. Yano, PA – (20 January 2006 – 03 August 2006)
 MGen. Fernando L. Mesa, PA – (03 August 2006 – 11 September 2007)
 MGen. Delfin N. Bangit, PA – (11 September 2007 – 8 May 2008)
 MGen. Roland M. Detabali, PA – (8 May 2008 – 02 June 2009)
 BGen. Florante B. Martinez, PA – (02 June 2009 – 23 July 2009)
 MGen. Jorge V. Segovia, PA – (23 July 2009 – 30 July 2010)
 MGen. Jessie D. Dellosa, PA – (30 July 2010 – 22 July 2011)
 BGen. Nestor A. Annonuevo, PA – (22 July 2011 – 23 August 2011)
 MGen. Romulo M. Bambao, PA – (23 August 2011 – 21 January 2012)
 MGen. Eduardo D. Del Rosario, PA – (21 January 2012 – 22 November 2012)
 MGen. Nonato Alfredo T. Peralta Jr., PA – (22 November 2012 – 25 November 2013)
 MGen. Rodelio V. Santos, PA – (25 November 2013 – 03 February 2015)
 MGen. Romeo G. Gan, PA – (03 February 2015 – 10 November 2016)
 MGen. Rhoderick M. Parayno, PA – (10 November 2016 – 03 May 2019)
 BGen. Elias H. Escarcha, PA – (3 May 2019 – 12 July 2019) (acting)
 MGen. Arnulfo Marcelo B. Burgos Jr., PA – (12 July 19 – 08 September 2020)
 MGen. Greg T. Almerol, PA – (11 September 2020 – 12 March 2021)
 MGen. Bartolome Vicente O. Bacarro, PA (21 April 2021 – 27 July 2021)
 MGen. Rowen S. Tolentino, PA – (27 July 2021 – 12 August 2022) 
 BGen. Rommel K. Tello, PA – (12 August 2022 – 20 October 2022) (acting)
 MGen. Roberto S. Capulong, PA – (20 October 2022 – Present)

1942 Order of Battle

Current
The following are the Brigade units that are under the 2nd Infantry Division.
 201st Infantry (Kabalikat) Brigade
 202nd Infantry (Unifier) Brigade
 203rd Infantry (Bantáy Kapayapaan) Brigade

The following are the Battalion units that are under the 2nd Infantry Division
 1st Infantry (Always First) Battalion
2nd CMO Battalion/Task Force Ugnay
 4th Infantry (Scorpion) Battalion
 16th Infantry (Maglilingkód) Battalion
 59th Infantry (Protector) Battalion
 68th Infantry (Kaagapay)  Battalion
 74th Infantry (Unbeatable) Battalion
 76th Infantry (Victrix) Battalion
 80th Infantry (Steadfast) Battalion
 85th Infantry (Sandiwà) Battalion
 92nd Infantry (Tanglaw Diwa) Battalion

2nd Division (PC)
 1st Constabulary Regiment (PC) (LCol. Irwin Alexander) (?) (Activated 15 Oct 1941)
 2nd Constabulary Regiment (PC) (Activated 17 Nov 1941)
 3rd Constabulary Regiment (PC) (Activated 12 Dec 1941)
 4th Constabulary Regiment (PC) (Activated 29 Dec 1941)

Operations
 The engagements of the military operations against the Imperial Japanese Armed Forces from January 3, 1942, to September 2, 1945, during World War II under the Japanese Occupation. 
 Anti-guerrilla operations against the New People's Army.
 Anti-terrorist operations against the Abu Sayyaf operating in their AOR.
 The 2nd Infantry Division was among the forerunners of what is now the 1st Scout Ranger Regiment.
 MGen Delfin Bangit was previously assigned as the Presidents Most Senior Aide-de-camp and is the commanding officer of the Presidential Security Group.
 MGen Pedro Cabouay was former commander of the Intelligence Service AFP and Light Armor Brigade (now Light Armor Division) was an alumnus of the University of Santo Tomas College of Commerce and is a product of the Philippine ROTC System.
 LtGen Alexander Yano, former commander of the 2ID, was previously assigned as Army Chief and later on as AFP Chief of Staff.
 MGen Fernando Mesa is currently serving as the AFP NCR Command's commanding general. Overseeing security measures for the National Capital Region and is also responsible in securing the seat of power of the Philippine Government.

References

 Official Site of the PA 2ID.

Infantry divisions of the Philippines
Philippine Army
Military units and formations established in 1936
Military units and formations reestablished in 1942
Military units and formations of the Philippine Army in World War II